The Blue Mountains and Southern Highlands Basalt Forests are a sclerophyll temperate forest community that stretch from the northern fringes of the Blue Mountains to the Southern Highlands. Featuring both wet and dry sclerophyll forests, as well as small rainforest pockets, the community features tall (30m+) and open eucalypt forests and woodlands that lie on igneous rock (Blue Mountains Basalts).

Geography

Part of the Eastern Australian temperate forests, the region is found on extremely fertile soils, between 750 m and 1050 m in elevation, in areas with annual rainfall of 950 to 1350 mm, mostly within in the Blue Mountains and Southern Highlands region, but it is also spread into Wolgan, Morton National Park, Meryla State Forest, Wollemi, and the basalt tops of Mount Irvine, Mount Wilson, Mount Tomah, Mount Banks and Mount Hay, with probable disjunct outliers north towards Mount Cameron and Mount Monundilla. Between 30 and 50% of the vegetation's original occurrence is estimated to remain.

The Wet Sclerophyll Basalt Forests of the Sydney Basin Bioregion, existing as a scattered remnant, also occurs in the ecoregion but in small percentage, such as in areas like the Yengo National Park, the Mount Gibraltar Reserve, Robertson, Moss Vale, Bundanoon and Wingello, which also lie on fertile soils derived from basalts. 

Other small basalt forest patches in the region include Southern Escarpment Wet Sclerophyll Forests, Robertson Basalt Tall Open Forest, Mount Gibraltar Forest, Robertson Basalt Brown Barrel, Montane Basalt Cap Forest, Robertson Basalt Tall Forest, Mount Gibraltar Forest and Moist Basalt Cap Forest. The wet sclerophyll forests only inhabit 6% of the Blue Mountains landscape, and have had once occupied the Oberon area.

Ecology
The canopy mixture is multivariate, but is normally predominated by species such as Eucalyptus fastigata, Eucalyptus blaxlandii, Eucalyptus cypellocarpa and Eucalyptus radiata subsp. radiata. Other locally common trees include Eucalyptus oreades, Acacia melanoxylon and Eucalyptus viminalis, in addition to the irregular rainforest trees such as Syncarpia glomulifera, Doryphora sassafras and Hedycarya angustifolia. A thin to dense layer of shrubs, vines, and various understorey of native grasses, forbs, twiners and ferns exist. 

The wet sclerophyll parts of the ecoregion feature shrubs such as Polyscias sambucifolia, Coprosma quadrifida, Senecio linearifolius, Daviesia ulicifolia and Leucopogon lanceolatus, including vines such as, Eustrephus latifolius, Rubus parvifolius, Rubus rosifolius, Smilax australis, Hardenbergia violacea and Hibbertia scandens. Ferns include Pteridium esculentum, Blechnum cartilagineum and Pellaea falcata.

Fauna
Mammals include Ninox strenua, Tyto tenebricosa, wallabies, pademelons, native rats, Antechinus spp, Tachyglossus aculeatus, Vombatus ursinus, Macropus giganteus and Pteropus poliocephalus. Birds include Monarcha melanopsis, Leucosarcia melanoleuca, Lopholaimus antarcticus, Chalcophaps indica, Macropygia amboinensis and Rhipidura rufifrons. Threatened reptile species is Varanus rosenbergi.

References 

Forests of New South Wales
Vegetation of Australia
Environment of New South Wales
Eastern Australian temperate forests
Temperate broadleaf and mixed forests
Ecoregions of New South Wales
Sclerophyll forests